Mount Le Conte (or LeConte) is a mountain located within the Great Smoky Mountains National Park in Sevier County, Tennessee.  At  it is the third highest peak in the national park, behind Clingmans Dome and Mount Guyot. It is also the highest peak that is completely within Tennessee. From its immediate base to its summit, Mount Le Conte is the mountain with the highest relief east of the Rocky Mountains, rising  from its base, near Gatlinburg, Tennessee (elevation ).

There are four subpeaks above  on the mountain (referred to as the LeConte massif): West Point, High Top, Cliff Tops, and Myrtle Point. In addition, Balsam Point, with an elevation above , serves as the dramatic west end of the massif.

Mount Le Conte has the highest inn that provides lodging for visitors in the Eastern United States.

History
There is controversy over which member of the Le Conte family the mountain was named for. The United States Geological Survey lists geologist Joseph Le Conte as the man for whom the mountain was named, supposedly by Swiss explorer Arnold Guyot. However, in recent years this claim has been challenged by local authorities (including the authors of A Natural History of Mount Le Conte), who believe that the mountain derives its name from Joseph's older brother John Le Conte, a physicist at South Carolina College. Their story alleges that the mountain was named by Samuel Buckley in respect to John's help in moving his barometer to Waynesville, North Carolina, at Buckley's request.

Although the mountain was measured in the 1850s, very little activity took place on the mountain until the 1920s, when Paul Adams moved to Knoxville, Tennessee. An enthusiastic hiker and explorer, Adams spent much of his free time creating adventures in the mountains. In 1924 he joined the Great Smoky Mountain Conservation Association, a group dedicated to making the region into a national park. As part of this push, later that year he led an expedition up the mountain with dignitaries from Washington, in order to show the group what rugged beauty those mountains held. The group spent the night in a large tent, on which site LeConte Lodge was eventually built and became a popular resort near the top of the peak. The trip was a great success, and about a decade later Mount Le Conte and the surrounding region was protected as part of the Great Smoky Mountains National Park.

Geology
Mount Le Conte lies in the Appalachian Blue Ridge geologic and physiographic province. It is made up of Late Proterozoic rocks, mostly metamorphosed sandstone, siltstone, shale, and conglomerate formed over 800–450 million years ago. Millions of years of weathering have caused significant erosion, giving the mountains in the region, including Le Conte, a distinctive, gentle sloping profile. A dense stand of Southern Appalachian spruce-fir forest, a remnant from the last ice age, coats the mountain's peaks and upper slopes.

Climate 

Mount Le Conte has a humid continental climate (Dfb) bordering on a subalpine climate (Dfc) due to its elevation, giving it cool summers, and cold winters. The climate is much cooler and somewhat wetter than the lower elevations.

LeConte Lodge

Mount Le Conte is notable for having the highest inn providing lodging for visitors in the Eastern United States.  The LeConte Lodge is a small resort, established in 1925, located on the top of the mountain. First, it was a tent, then a single cabin, and now it is a series of small personal log cabins and a central lodge and dining hall near the top of a mountain. It can accommodate about 50 guests and is generally open from March–November. There is no transportation to the lodge, and all guests must hike in on one of the five trails that access the mountain. Because of this lack of access, supplies must be brought in via helicopter and llama pack trains.  The climate at the lodge is similar to that found in southern Canada, with cool summers and cold, snowy winters. Currently, the lodge is maintained under a lease with the National Park Service.

Access

Le Conte's location in the Great Smoky Mountains National Park has spurred the creation of five trails that lead to the LeConte Lodge, with spur trails to each of the individual peaks. In addition to the scenic overlooks and peaceful woodlands endemic to each path, every trail offers attractions along the way to the summit. They are listed with their distances one-way as follows:

 Alum Cave Trail — . Alum Cave Creek, Arch Rock, Alum Cave Bluff and views into Huggins Hell adorn the trail. It is the most scenic and most often used trail to the summit.
 The Boulevard Trail —  from the Appalachian Trail ( from Newfound Gap). It never dips below .
 Bullhead Trail — . The least traveled path, it offers the most solitude.
 Rainbow Falls Trail — . LeConte Creek runs alongside the trail until Rainbow Falls, the single highest drop of water in the national park.
 Trillium Gap Trail — . The trail passes behind Grotto Falls, the only opportunity to walk behind a waterfall in the park. Trillium Gap offers spring wildflowers and a short spur hike to Brushy Mountain, the only horse trail on the mountain. The llama trains that supply the lodge use this trail.

The combined traffic of these five trails makes Mount Le Conte one of the most heavily traversed mountains in the park. The Alum Cave and Rainbow Falls trails in particular tend to become overcrowded with visitors seeking rewarding payoffs just a few miles into the trails. Hikers can stay in an Appalachian Trail style shelter overnight for $4, limited to 12 spots, with a backcountry permit and reservations from the National Park Service.

The area was affected by the 2016 Southeastern United States wildfires. The park, including the area around Mt. Le Conte, was evacuated during the disaster.

References

 USGS Mount Le Conte
 Brief History of Mount Le Conte
 Vital Statistics from Peak Bagger
 Newspaper Article Addressing Namesake Confusion
 Manning, Russ and Sondra Jamieson. The Best of the Great Smoky Mountains National Park. Norris, TN; Mountain Laurel Press, 1991. 
 
 National Weather Service Regional Max/Min Temp and Precipitation Table

External links
 LeConte Lodge Homepage
 Smoky Mountain landforms

Mountains of Tennessee
Southern Sixers
Mountains of Great Smoky Mountains National Park
Protected areas of Sevier County, Tennessee
Mountains of Sevier County, Tennessee
Mountain huts in the United States